Underpowered may refer to:
Underpowered (power of a test)
Underpowered (game balance)